Joyce Osborne is a former New Zealand international lawn bowler.

Bowls career
Osborne played in the team that won the silver medal in the triples event with Pearl Dymond and Jennifer Simpson at the 1982 Commonwealth Games. Four years later she represented New Zealand again at the Lawn bowls at the 1986 Commonwealth Games.

Osborne has also won two gold medals at the 1985 Asia Pacific Bowls Championships in Tweed Heads, New South Wales, Australia and a silver medal two years later.

She won the singles title at the 1972 and 1983 New Zealand National Bowls Championships when bowling for the Manawatu Bowls Club.

Personal life
Osborne's sister was Pearl Dymond and her brother is jockey Vic Sellars.

References

New Zealand female bowls players
Living people
Bowls players at the 1982 Commonwealth Games
Bowls players at the 1986 Commonwealth Games
Commonwealth Games medallists in lawn bowls
Commonwealth Games silver medallists for New Zealand
Year of birth missing (living people)
20th-century New Zealand women
Medallists at the 1982 Commonwealth Games